Rb or RB may stand for:

People
 R. B. (nickname)
 Rebecca Black, an American pop singer
 Richard Blackwood, a British rapper

Places
 R. B. Winter State Park, a park in Pennsylvania
 Rancho Bernardo, a community in San Diego, California, United States

Arts and entertainment
 Rhythm and blues, a music genre combining blues, gospel and jazz influences
 Rock Band, a music video game series
 Rock Band (video game), the game of the same name
Ultraman R/B, a Japanese television series

Businesses
 Rankin/Bass, an American production company, known for its seasonal television specials
 Ray-Ban, a sunglasses company
 Reckitt Benckiser, a company in the United Kingdom
 Syrian Arab Airlines (IATA airline code RB)

Government and politics
 Radio Bremen, a public broadcaster for the German state of Bremen
 Parti de la Renaissance du Bénin or Benin Rebirth Party, a political party in Benin
 República Bolivariana, Spanish-language phrase for the type of government in Venezuela
 Rupiah Banda, President of Zambia

Science and technology 

 .rb, the file extension for documents created in Ruby or in REAL Basic
 Rebar (short for reinforcing bar), used in reinforced concrete structures
 Retinoblastoma, a childhood cancer of the eyes caused by a mutation in the retinoblastoma protein
 Retinoblastoma protein, a tumor suppressor protein
 Rubidium, symbol Rb, a chemical element
 Reflected binary code, Gray code
 Request Block, a task-related control block in OS/360 and successors.

Vehicles and transportation 
 Hyundai RB (buses), a series of Korean buses
 SJ Rb, a Swedish locomotive
 Nissan RB engine, a gasoline engine made by Nissan
 Re-entry body, the US Air Force term for a re-entry vehicle
 Regionalbahn, a type of train in Germany
 Réseau Breton, a French railway network in Brittany

Sport
 Running back, a position in North America football
 Right back, a defensive position in association football
 RB Leipzig, German football club

Other uses
 Rowboat

See also

 
 
 
 Royal Bank (disambiguation)